The 1983 NASL Grand Prix of Indoor Soccer was an indoor soccer tournament staged by four franchises of the North American Soccer League.

Overview
The NASL franchises from Fort Lauderdale, Tampa Bay, Montreal, and Tulsa opted to play the Grand Prix in early 1983 as a makeshift indoor season, because for various reasons, the eight other NASL clubs had chosen to forego playing a full 1982–83 NASL indoor season. Three of those eight teams (Chicago, Golden Bay and San Diego) had joined the Major Indoor Soccer League for 1982-83 season, while the remaining five squads chose to sit out winter indoor play completely. 

The tournament consisted of three weeks of double round-robin play for the purpose of seeding, followed by a Championship weekend at the Forum in Montreal. Fort Lauderdale did not host a round because there was no suitable venue in the area that also met the minimum seating requirements. Instead, Tulsa hosted Rounds 1 and 3. The tournament would mark the third time NASL teams played in such an event, with the first two coming in 1975 and 1976. Additionally the teams participated in a season-long Shootout Challenge competition, the champions of which would split a $5,000 purse.

Montreal and Tampa Bay finished tied on both points and record after the preliminary rounds, but Montreal held the head-to-head tie-breaker, and with it the top seed. Tampa Bay won the championship final 5–4 on a golden goal by Mark Karpun at 1:58 of the second, seven and a half minute, overtime period. This victory marked the Rowdies' third indoor trophy and fourth title overall in the NASL. Laurie Abrahams of Tulsa led all scorers (12 goals, 6 assists) and was named the offensive MVP, while Montreal goalie Mehdi Cerbah who posted a 4.36 goals-against-average was the defensive MVP of the tournament. Tampa Bay also won the $5,000 Shootout Challenge purse by defeating Ft. Lauderdale, 2–0, with Rowdies goalie Jürgen Stars stopping all three Strikers shots in the final round.

Preliminary rounds

Round 1
played at Tulsa Fairgrounds Pavilion in Tulsa, Oklahoma

Round 2
played at the Bayfront Center in St. Petersburg, Florida

Round 3
played at the Tulsa Fairgrounds Pavilion in Tulsa, Oklahoma

Seeding
G = Games, W = Wins, L = Losses, GF = Goals For, GA = Goals Against, GD = Goal Differential, PTS= point system

6 points awarded for a win.
Beginning with the fourth goal, 1 bonus point awarded for each goal scored.
Maximum of 5 bonus points per game.

*Montreal wins top seed based on 2–0 head-to-head edge over Tampa Bay

Grand Prix Championship rounds

Bracket

Semi-finals
played at the Montreal Forum in Montreal, Quebec

Third-place match
played at the Montreal Forum in Montreal, Quebec (1:30 PM EST)

Championship final

1983 Indoor Grand Prix Champions: Tampa Bay Rowdies

Tournament awards
Most Valuable Players:  - Offensive:  Laurie Abrahams (Tulsa) - Goals: 12 Assists: 6 Total Pts: 30  - Defensive:  Mehdi Cerbah (Montreal) Goals-against-average: 4.36
$5,000 Shootout Challenge:  - Semi-finals: Tampa Bay 3 – 1 Tulsa • Fort Lauderdale 3 – 1 Montreal - Finals: Tampa Bay 2 – 0 Fort Lauderdale

Final rankings
G = Games, W = Wins, L = Losses, GF = Goals For, GA = Goals Against, GD = Goal Differential

Statistics

Non-grand prix matches
In addition to the Grand Prix tournament, the four teams took part in other indoor matches as tune-ups for both the outdoor season and the Grand Prix itself.

Match reports

References

NASL Indoor seasons
NASL
1983 in Canadian sports
I
1983